Joseph-Napoléon Caron (November 7, 1896 – October 17, 1970) was a politician Quebec, Canada and a one-term Member of the Legislative Assembly of Quebec (MLA).

Early life

He was born on November 7, 1896 in Louiseville, Mauricie and was a hardware store owner.

City Politics

Caron served as a Councilmember in Louiseville in 1925.

Member of the legislature

He ran as a Union Nationale candidate in the district of Maskinongé in the 1936 provincial election and defeated Liberal incumbent Louis-Joseph Thisdel. He did not run for re-election in 1939.

Death

He died on October 17, 1970 in Trois-Rivières.

See also
Maskinongé Provincial Electoral District
Louiseville
Mauricie

References

1896 births
1970 deaths
Union Nationale (Quebec) MNAs
French Quebecers